Aphria may refer to:
 Aphria (company), a medical cannabis company in Canada
 Aphria (fly), a genus of flies

See also
 Mestolobes aphrias